Whittemore may refer to:

 Whittemore (surname)
 Whittemore, Iowa, United States
 Whittemore, Michigan, United States